Fong Chung-Ray (Chinese:馮鍾睿; born 1933) is a Chinese artist regarded as one of the pioneers of abstraction in Chinese painting.

Early life 
At the age of 14, Fong Chung-Ray was obliged to leave his family and go into exile, due to the Chinese Civil War when he enlisted as a lieutenant in the navy. As the army moved to different locations and various political events occurred, he settled in Taiwan in 1949.

Artistic practice 
Fong Chung-Ray's passion for art and inquiring mind led him to take an interest in Western abstract art, which he discovered through reading journals and books, available in the American Library in Taipei. In 1957, he founded the Four Seas Artists Association with his friend, Hu Chi-Chung. During this period, he experimented with abstraction and used new Western techniques, such as painting with oil on canvas. In 1961, he became a member of the Wuyue Group (Fifth Moon Group) and participated in many exhibitions. in 1963, on the advice of Liu Guosong, a painter and the Group’s theorist, he abandoned painting with oil on canvas and returned to the traditional Chinese technique of ink painting. Fong Chung-Ray then invented a brush made from palm tree fibres, which added a highly personal touch and a rougher quality to his sweeps of colour. The abstract ink works from this period, with their blend of subtle colouring, dynamic strokes, wet sweeps of colour, and poetry, were rooted directly in the tradition of the Chinese master landscape painters.

In 1971, he was awarded a Rockefeller Foundation grant that enabled him to travel to Europe and the united States. When he settled in San Francisco in 1975, he began to work with acrylic paint. Initially, his work focused on abstract landscapes, but he gradually moved away from this movement when he turned to Buddhist spirituality. This fresh source of inspiration resulted in a more abstract approach, related to temporality, which he studied in the sacred texts.

The effects of time on materials and an exploration of the technique of collages and imprints have become fundamental aspects of his artistic approach. By going beyond the formal representation of nature, Fong Chung-Ray has revived the spiritual essence that emanates from the paintings by the great old masters and invites the viewer to contemplate.

Selected solo exhibitions 

 2015 Galerie Du Monde, RAS de Hong Kong, Chine
 2015 Art Taipei, Modern Art Gallery, Taipei, Taiwan
 2014 Modern Art Gallery, Taichung, Taiwan
 2011 Modern Art Gallery, Taichung, Taiwan
 2008 Modern Art Gallery, Taichung, Taïwan
 2004 Galerie Triangle, San Francisco, Californie, États-Unis
 1992 Galerie Allrich, San Francisco, Californie, États-Unis
 1990 Galerie d’art moderne de Carmel, Carmel, Californie, États-Unis
 1987 Galeries Landell, Carmel, Californie, États-Unis
 1984/86 Galerie M. M. Shinno, Los Angeles, Californie, États-Unis
 1983 Galerie M. M. Shinno, Los Angeles, Californie, États-Unis  Galerie Nouveau Monde, Carmel, Californie, États-Unis
 1982 Galerie Triangle, San Francisco, Californie, États-Unis
 1979 Galerie M. M. Shinno, Los Angeles, Californie, États-Unis
 1978 Galerie Triangle, San Francisco, Californie, États-Unis
 1975 Galerie du siège mondial de la Banque d’Amérique, San Francisco, Californie, États-Unis  Commission des Beaux-Arts, Scottsdale, Arizona, États-Unis
 1974 Musée national d’histoire, Taipei, Taïwan
 1973 Galerie Marianne Schreiber, Munich, Allemagne
 1972 Musée d'art de San Diego, San Diego, Californie, États-Unis  Galerie Lee Nordness, New York, États-Unis  Galerie Downtown, Honolulu, Hawaii, États-Unis
 1968 Galerie Magic Touch, Taipei, Taïwan
 1967 Galerie Hai-Tien, Taipei, Taïwan
 1965 Centre d’art national de Taïwan, Taipei, Taïwan

Major public collections 

 Taipei Fine Arts Museum, Taipei, Taiwan
 National Gallery of Art and Museum of History, Taipei, Taiwan
 National Taiwan Arts Center, Taipei, Taiwan
 M.H. De Young Museum, San Francisco, United States
 The Denver Art Museum, Denver, Colorado, United States
 San Diego Museum of Fine Arts, San Diego, California, United States
 National Taiwan Museum of Fine Art, Taichung, Taiwan
 Asian Art Museum, San Francisco, California, United States
 Baltimore Museum of Art, Baltimore, Maryland, United States
 Kaohsiung Art Museum, Kaohsiung, Taiwan
 Arthur M. Sackler Museum, Harvard University, Boston, Massachusetts, United States
 Guangdong Museum of Art, Guangzhou, China
 Shenzhen Fine Art Research Institute, Shenzhen, China

Selected group exhibitions 

 Museum of Ixelles, Brussels, Belgium
 San Francisco State University Gallery, San Francisco, United States
 Taipei Fine Arts Museum, Taipei, Taiwan
 Dr. Sun Yat San Memorial Hall, Taipei, Taiwan
 Guangdong Museum of Art, Guangzhou, China
 Triangle Gallery, San Francisco, United States
 Gallery On The Rim, San Francisco, United States
 The Allrich Gallery, San Francisco, United States
 City Hall, Hong Kong

Catalogues 

 Fong Chung-Ray : A retrospective, Silicon Valley Asian Art Center. 2013. p. 147,
 Lü Peng. A History of Art in 20th-Century China. Somogy, éditions d'art. Paris. 2013, p. 438-469.
 Michael Sullivan. Art and Artists of Twentieth-Century China. University of California Press. 1996, p. 1984-85.. Retrieved 3 July 2012.
 Julia F.Andrews and Kuiyi Shen. The Art of Modern China. University of California Press, 2012. p. 248-49.
 Michael Sullivan. Moderne chinese artists, a biographical dictionary. University of California Press. 2006.
 Formless Form : Taiwanese Abstract Art. Taipei Fine Arts Museum. 2012.
 The Modernist Wave. Taiwan Art in the 1950s and 1960s. National Taiwan Museum of Fine Arts. 2011. p. 147,
 The Search for the Avant-Garde 1946-69. TFAM Collection Catalogue. Volume II. Taipei Fine Arts Museum. 2011. reprint 2012. p. 308-309.
 Asian traditions/ modern expressions : Asian American Artists and Abstractions, 1945-1970. Edited by Jeffrey Weschler.Harry N. Abrams, Inc., Publishers, in association with the Jane Voorhees Zimmerli Art Museum, Rutgers, The State University of New Jersey. 1997.p. 41.
 A Tradition Redefined, Modern and Contemporary Chinese Ink Paintings from the Chu-tsing Li Collection 1950-2000, Edited by Robert D.Mowry, Yale University Press.

See also
Taiwanese art

References

1933 births
Living people
Republic of China painters
Taiwanese people from Henan
Painters from Henan
Republic of China Navy sailors
20th-century Taiwanese painters